Freddy's Rescue Roundup is a non-scrolling platform game for IBM PC DOS released in 1984 by IBM. The goal of the game is to collect all of the roadrunners on a particular level in order to advance through the game. Doorways aid in quickly traveling across a level, while enemy robots work against the player's progress. Visually, it is similar to Broderbund's Lode Runner, but there is less emphasis on puzzles.

Development

The development title was Roadrunner Rescue. There was a crude program for editing mazes, but it wasn't in the shipped version, at least partly because IBM felt it made the game too much like Lode Runner.

The game is written mostly in compiled BASIC v1.0, with a few assembly modules linked in for graphics, sound, and keyboard support.

References

1984 video games
Platform games
DOS games
DOS-only games
Video games developed in the United States